Michael Bennighof is a game designer who has worked primarily on board games.

Early life and education
Mike Bennighof, Ph.D., is a Fulbright Scholar, and holds a doctorate in History from Emory University. He has played and coached semi-pro football, taught college, worked as a newspaper reporter, and shoveled gravel professionally.

Career
Mike Bennighof has been designing games since the early 1980s, working on over 100 titles as designer or developer. Bennighof is president of Avalanche Press, Ltd., a publisher of traditional board wargames. He has won Origins Awards both for wargame design (U.S. Navy Plan Orange) and role-playing game design (Celtic Age). He scripted the Panzer General II (for which he also designed the maps)  and Destroyer Commander computer games, among others; designed such games as Survival of the Witless, Panzer Grenadier, and Great War at Sea; and was the author of the infamous book, Black Flags. Great War at Sea received awards at the Origins Awards in 1998 and 1999.

References

Board game designers
Emory University alumni
Living people
Year of birth missing (living people)